Neetha Shetty is an Indian television actress.

Career 
Neetha has played the role of Sanjana in the TV series Mamta, telecasted on Zee TV. She has also acted in Banoo Main Teri Dulhann (as Dr. Shivani), and in Tum Bin Jaaoon Kahaan (as Khushi), both on Zee TV.

In 2018, Neetha starred in the Season 1 of the ALTBalaji’s web series Gandii Baat.

Filmography

Television

Films

Web series

Video songs

References

External links
 
 

Indian television actresses
Living people
Indian soap opera actresses
Place of birth missing (living people)
Year of birth missing (living people)
Bigg Boss Marathi contestants